Exim Bank Group (East Africa) (EBGEA), is a financial services conglomerate based in the African Great Lakes region. EBGEA's headquarters are in Dar es Salaam, Tanzania, with subsidiaries in Uganda, Tanzania, Comoros, Djibouti and Ethiopia.

Overview
EBGEA is a large financial services conglomerate. As of 15 July 2022, the group had estimated assets exceeding TZS 2.4 trillion (US$1.033 billion).

At the end of December 2021, the group had banking operations in four countries across the East African region. The bank issues "TANAPA" Mastercards and Visa cards, acceptable regionally and internationally. At that time the group employed 937 staff members. The group's shareholders' equity at that time was TZS 204.015 billion (US$ 87.844 million).

History
EBT was formed in 1997 by a group of Tanzanian business people. The bank is reported to have broken even within the first five months of operation. The subsidiary in the Comoros was established first, in 2007. Later, in 2011, Exim Bank opened a subsidiary in Djibouti. In 2016, the bank set foot in neighboring Uganda, by acquiring shareholding in the former Imperial Bank Uganda, converting it into Exim Bank Uganda. In December 2019 the Group established a representative office in Ethiopia, through its Djibouti subsidiary. In July 2022, Exim Bank Tanzania acquired First National Bank of Tanzania, bringing total group assets to TZS 2.4 trillion (US$1.033+ billion).

Member companies
The group consists of the following subsidiaries: Exim Bank (Comoros), Exim Bank (Djibouti), Exim Bank (Uganda) and Exim Bank (Tanzania).

See also
 List of banks in Tanzania
 List of banks in Uganda
 List of banks in Djibouti
 List of banks in Comoros

References

External links
Website of Exim Bank Tanzania

Banks of Tanzania
Companies of Tanzania
Banks established in 1997
Conglomerate companies of Tanzania
Conglomerate companies established in 1997
1997 establishments in Tanzania